Season 1985–86 was the 102nd football season in which Dumbarton competed at a Scottish national level, entering the Scottish Football League for the 80th time, the Scottish Cup for the 91st time and the Scottish League Cup for the 39th time.

Overview 
Dumbarton returned to the First Division as favourites for the title, and in mid October the team was sitting atop the league.  However results took an inexplicable nosedive with 2 wins in 11 games, accounting for Davie Wilson's resignation at the beginning of February.  Alex Wright took over as caretaker manager until the end of the season, and an initial run of only 2 defeats in 11 matches placed the club well clear in 2nd place with only 6 games remaining. However, 4 nervy defeats in those closing fixtures dropped Dumbarton to 6th place, 13 points behind champions Hamilton but only 2 points shy of 2nd placed Falkirk, and one of four clubs just missing out on a promotion spot. 

In the Scottish Cup, Dumbarton lost embarrassingly to Second Division Queen's Park in the third round.

The League Cup was no better with another disappointing exit in the second round to Second Division Stirling Albion.

Locally, however, in the Stirlingshire Cup, there was something to smile about with the trophy returning to Boghead after a final win over Clydebank.

Finally, despite losing Premier Division status, Dumbarton were invited to participate in the annual televised indoor Tennent's Sixes tournament, as both Rangers and Celtic had declined to enter. After winning all three qualifying matches, 1-0 vs St Mirren, 0-0 (4-3 on penalties) vs Dundee and 4-0 vs Manchester City, Dumbarton suffered a narrow 1-0 defeat in the semi final to the eventual tournament winners Aberdeen.

Results & fixtures

Scottish First Division

Skol Cup

Scottish Cup

Stirlingshire Cup

Pre-season matches

League table

Player statistics

Squad 

|}

Transfers

Players in

Players out

Reserve team
Dumbarton competed in the Scottish Reserve League (West), winning 10 and drawing 5 of 18 matches finishing runners up to Airdrie.

In the Reserve League Cup Dumbarton lost in the second round to Celtic.

Trivia
 The League match against Partick Thistle on 17 August marked Ray Montgomerie's 100th appearance for Dumbarton in all national competitions - the 91st Dumbarton player to reach this milestone.
 The League match against Clyde on 15 March marked Mark Clougherty's 200th appearance for Dumbarton in all national competitions - the 19th Dumbarton player to break the 'double century'.
 Early in the season there was a tragic death in the playing staff - that of popular defender Eric Schaedler.  Eric had been signed up in the close season and had become a firm favourite with the Dumbarton fans.

See also
 1985–86 in Scottish football

References

External links
Ken Thomson (Dumbarton Football Club Historical Archive)
Mark Williams (Dumbarton Football Club Historical Archive)
Scottish Football Historical Archive

Dumbarton F.C. seasons
Scottish football clubs 1985–86 season